Roger Messau Kangni (1944 – 10 September 2021) was a Togolese middle-distance runner. He competed in the men's 800 metres at the 1972 Summer Olympics.

References

External links
 

1944 births
2021 deaths
Athletes (track and field) at the 1972 Summer Olympics
Togolese male middle-distance runners
Olympic athletes of Togo
Place of birth missing
21st-century Togolese people